English Station is an abandoned thermal power plant in New Haven, Connecticut. It occupies eight acres of land on Ball Island in the Mill River, Connecticut, which separates the neighborhoods of Wooster Square and Fair Haven.  It was constructed from 1924 to 1929. The plant operated as a coal- and oil-fired power plant for United Illuminating until it stopped electricity-generating operations in 1991. In 2019-2021 the turbines were removed and certain areas have been prepared for demolition.

The site, which United Illuminating sold in 2000, is known to be heavily contaminated with asbestos and PCBs.

References

Energy infrastructure completed in 1924
Power stations in Connecticut
Buildings and structures in New Haven, Connecticut
Fossil fuel power stations in the United States